Friendly Enemies is a 1942 American drama film starring Charles Winninger, Charlie Ruggles, James Craig, and Nancy Kelly.  The film was directed by Allan Dwan, adapted from a 1918 play of the same name by Aaron Hoffman and Samuel Shipman. It was nominated an Academy Award in the category of Best Sound Recording (Jack Whitney).

Plot
A New York City brewer by the name of Karl Pfeiffer takes a stand against President Wilson's decision to send troops to Europe to support the Allies in World War I. Karl is a native German who doesn't want his birthplace destroyed in the war.

Trying to find another way to help stop the war, Karl is an easy target for the cunning saboteur Anton Miller. Miller meets Karl posing as propaganda expert named George Stewart, and can persuades Karl to donate $50,000 to the cause of stopping the war. The check will be ready for picking up the day after at Karl's home on Manhattan. 
That same evening Karl attends a dinner in honor of Henry Block, who is the father of June, who is about to marry Karl's son. When it comes to politics, Henry's views are opposite of Karl's and they often start to argue when they meet.

Because of Karl's views and bad temper the rest of the family have kept it a secret that his son William has joined the Army. At the dinner Karl is told about this and reacts as expected with an outburst. He leaves the apartment in anger, but tries to persuade his son to change his mind the following day. Miller is interested when he hears that the famously wealthy Henry is soon to be related to Karl, and wants to meet up with him.

William stands by his decision to fight in the war, and soon he embarks with a military transport ship out of the New York City harbor. On the way to Europe the ship is sunk by saboteurs and Karl gets a message from Miller that the money he donated was well spent.

Realizing his mistake in trusting Miller, the devastated Karl decides to avenge his son by killing Miller. Henry comes to his aid, and together they come up with a plan to disclose Miller as a saboteur instead.

They arrange a meeting between Miller and Henry, at which Miller is forced to reveal his identity and is arrested by the police.

Later, it turns out that William wasn't killed when the ship sunk, and he comes home to reunite with his family and wife. Having learnt his lesson, Karl decides to give up his political beliefs and care for his family instead. The fact that he has become a true American patriot is displayed in full when he sings "My country 'tis of thee" together with his family.

Cast
 Charles Winninger as Karl Pfeiffer
 Charlie Ruggles as Heinrich Block
 James Craig as Bill Pfeiffer
 Nancy Kelly as June Block
 Otto Kruger as Anton Miller
 Ilka Grüning as Mrs. Pfeiffer
 Greta Meyer as Gretchen
 Addison Richards as Inspector McCarthy
 Charles Lane as Braun
 John Piffle as Schnitzler
 Ruth Holley as Nora
 Murray Alper as Delivery man

Production
The movie was based on a play which had been very popular during World War I and filmed in 1925 under the same title. Edward Small bought the rights in 1942. Filming started in early February 1942.

Reception
Reviews were average.

Small said he wanted to reunite the two stars in Batter Up, but the film was never made.

Radio adaptation
Friendly Enemies was presented on Philip Morris Playhouse June 26, 1942. Ruggles and Winninger reprised their roles.

References

External links
 

1942 films
1940s English-language films
American black-and-white films
American films based on plays
Western Front (World War I) films
Films directed by Allan Dwan
1942 drama films
Films produced by Edward Small
American drama films
Films based on works by American writers
1940s American films